The John Humphrey Freedom Award was presented annually by the Canadian human rights group Rights & Democracy, to an organization or individual from any country or region of the world for exceptional achievement in the promotion of human rights and democratic development. It was established in 1992.

The award consisted of a grant of C$25,000, as well as a speaking tour of Canadian cities to help increase awareness of the recipient’s human rights work.

It was named in honor of John Peters Humphrey, a Canadian human rights law professor who prepared the first draft of the Universal Declaration of Human Rights.

Award winners
2011 - Ales Michalevic, Belarus
2010 - PROVEA (Programa Venezolano de Educacion-Accion en Derechos Humanos), Venezuela
2009 - La'Onf, the Iraqi Nonviolence Network, Iraq
2008 - Zimbabwe Lawyers for Human Rights, Zimbabwe
2007 - Akbar Ganji, Iran
2006 - Su Su Nway, Burma 
2005 - Yan Christian Warinussy, West Papua, Indonesia
2004 - Godeliève Mukasarasi, Rwanda
2003 - Kimy Pernía Domicó, Colombia and Angélica Mendoza de Ascarza, Peru
2002 - Ayesha Imam, Nigeria
2001 - Dr. Sima Samar, Afghanistan
2000 - Reverend Timothy Njoya, Kenya
1999 – Cynthia Maung and Min Ko Naing, Burma 
1998 – Palden Gyatso, Tibet
1997 – Father Javier Giraldo, Colombia
1996 – Sultana Kamal, Bangladesh
1995 – Bishop Carlos Filipe Ximenes Belo, East Timor
1994 – Campaign for Democracy, Nigeria and Egyptian Organization for Human Rights, Egypt
1993 – La Plate-forme des organismes haïtiens de défense des droits humains, Haïti
1992 – Instituto de Defensa Legal, Peru

External links
 Official Website

Human rights awards
Canadian awards
Awards established in 1992
1992 establishments in Canada